Bennett Lake is a lake in the Province of British Columbia and Yukon Territory in northwestern Canada, at an elevation of 2602 ft. (642 m.) . It is just north of the border with the United States state of Alaska, near the Alaskan port of Skagway.

The narrow-gauge White Pass and Yukon Route Railroad connects the community of Bennett at the south end of the lake with Skagway further south and Whitehorse, Yukon on the north. It runs between Skagway and Fraser, British Columbia during the summer months.

The abandoned town of Bennett, British Columbia, historically usually referred to as Lake Bennett or Bennett Lake and the town of Carcross, Yukon are on the shores of Bennett Lake.

History
During the Klondike Gold Rush, Bennett Lake was where the gold-seekers who had crossed the Coast Mountains from Skagway or Dyea, carrying their goods over the Chilkoot Trail or the White Pass, purchased or built rafts to float down the Yukon River to the gold fields at Dawson City, Yukon, Canada.  A large tent city  sprang up on its shores, numbering in the thousands and offering all the services of a major city.

In late May 1898, the North-West Mounted Police counted 778 boats under construction at Lindeman Lake (located a difficult portage above Bennett Lake), 850 in Bennett and the surrounding area, and another 198 at Caribou Crossing (now Carcross) and Tagish Lake to help transport thousands of goldfield-bound travellers.  It was further estimated that another 1,200 boats were built in these areas over the next few weeks.

Name origin
Named in 1883 by Frederick Schwatka, US Army officer and explorer, after James Gordon Bennett Jr (1841–1918), editor of the New York Herald, who was sponsor of Schwatchka's search for the remains of the Franklin Expedition, 1878-81.

Hydrology
The main outflow of the lake is the Nares River, which flows to Nares Lake. Nares Lake empties into Tagish Lake; then via the Tagish River to Marsh Lake, the source of the Yukon River, which flows to the Bering Sea.

Inflows

Watson River
Wheaton River
Millhaven Creek
Dry Creek
MacAuley Creek
Partridge River
Latreille Creek
Homan River
Lindeman Creek
Dundalk Creek
Knob Creek
McDonald Creek

Historical image gallery

See also
Bennett Lake Volcanic Complex
Bennett Range

References

External links

Bennett
Bennett
Bennett
Atlin District